Goelz (also spelled Gölz) is a surname. It is either of German or Slavic origin, and a variant of the surname Geltz. Notable people with this name include:

Billy Goelz (1918–2002) American professional wrestler, booker, and trainer
Dave Goelz (born 1946), American puppeteer and puppet builder, known for his work with the Muppets
Rolf Gölz (born 1962), German road and track cyclist, and Olympic medal winner for West Germany

References